Donguz may refer to:

Donguz (river), a tributary of the Ural in Russia
Donguz Formation, Russia
Donguz range, Russia
Donguz, a former name the settlement of Pervomaysky, Orenburgsky District, Orenburg Oblast (:ru:Первомайский (Оренбургский район))

See also
Donguz-Orun